Dactylosporangium is a genus of bacteria in the phylum Actinomycetota.

Etymology
The name Dactylosporangium derives from:Greek noun daktulos, finger; Greek noun spora (σπορά), a seed, and in biology a spore; Greek neuter gender noun angeion (Latin transliteration angium), vessel ; New Latin neuter gender noun Dactylosporangium an organism with finger-shaped, spore-containing vessels (sporangia).

Species
The genus Dactylosporangium comprises the following species:
 D. aurantiacum Thiemann et al. 1967 (Approved Lists 1980) (New Latin neuter gender adjective aurantiacum, orange colored.)
 D. cerinum Liu et al. 2015
 D. darangshiense Seo and Lee 2010 (New Latin neuter gender adjective darangshiense, of or pertaining to Darangshi, referring to Darangshi Oreum in Jeju, Republic of Korea, the site from which the type strain was isolated.)
 D. fulvum Shomura et al. 1986 (Latin neuter gender adjective fulvum, deep yellow, tawny, yellowish brown, referring to the color of the vegetative mycelium.)
 D. luridum Kim et al. 2010 (Latin neuter gender adjective luridum, pale yellow.)
 D. luteum Kim et al. 2010 (Latin neuter gender adjective luteum, orange–yellow, flame-coloured.)
 D. maewongense Chiaraphongphon et al. 2010 (New Latin neuter gender adjective maewongense, pertaining to Maewong National Park, where the type strain was isolated.)
 D. matsuzakiense Shomura and Niida 1983 (New Latin neuter gender adjective matsuzakiense, of or pertaining to Matsuzaki-cho, Izu Peninsula, Japan.)
 D. roseum Shomura et al. 1985 (Latin neuter gender adjective roseum, rose colored, pink.)
 D. salmoneum (ex Celmer et al. 1978) Kim et al. 2010 (Latin noun salmo -onis, salmon; Latin adjective suff. -eus -a -um, suffix used with various meanings; New Latin neuter gender adjective salmoneum, salmon-coloured.)
 D. siamense Thawai and Suriyachadkun 2013
 D. solaniradicis Fan et al. 2016
 D. sucinum Phongsopitanun et al. 2016
 D. thailandense Thiemann et al. 1967 (Approved Lists 1980) (New Latin neuter gender adjective thailandense, of or pertaining to Thailand.)
 D. tropicum Thawai et al. 2011

 D. vinaceum Shomura et al. 1983 (Latin neuter gender adjective vinaceum, of or belonging to wine, intended to mean wine colored.)

See also 
 Bacterial taxonomy
 Microbiology

References 

Bacteria genera
Micromonosporaceae